"Dynamite!" is a song produced by Narada Michael Walden, co-written by Walden and Bunny Hull, and recorded by Stacy Lattisaw for her second studio album Let Me Be Your Angel (1980). The song was released as the lead single from Let Me Be Your Angel in 1980.

Chart performance
In the United States, "Dynamite!" did not make the Billboard Hot 100, but it hit number one on the Dance Club Songs chart (where it was her only number-one hit in general), and it peaked at number eight on the Hot R&B/Hip Hop Songs chart. Lattisaw was just 13 years old when she made it to number-one and was the youngest act to have a number-one single on the Dance Club Songs chart at that time.

Track listings and formats
7" single

 "Dynamite!" – 4:20
 "Dreaming" – 4:45

12" single

 "Dynamite!" – 5:58
 "Dreaming" – 4:45

Charts

References

Stacy Lattisaw songs
1980 songs
1980 singles
Songs written by Narada Michael Walden
Song recordings produced by Narada Michael Walden
Cotillion Records singles
Funk songs
Songs written by Bunny Hull